John Henry Augustin Prichard, later Riseley-Prichard, (17 January 1924 in Hereford – 8 July 1993 in Thailand) was a British insurance broker and racing driver.

After getting a taste for motorsport in a road-going Riley, he bought a second-hand Connaught Type A from the Rob Walker Racing Team. Using this vehicle he participated in one Formula One World Championship Grand Prix: the British Grand Prix on 17 July 1954. He spun out of the race, scoring no championship points. In addition to this he competed in a number of non-Championship Formula One and Formula Libre races, including a victory in the 1954 I Cornwall MRC Formula 1 Race.

Riseley-Prichard shared an Aston Martin in the infamous 1955 24 Hours of Le Mans race with Tony Brooks, but after the trauma of this event retired from race driving. Later in the same year, he let Brooks take the wheel of his Connaught, giving the future Vanwall and Ferrari star his first big break.

Later in life, Riseley-Prichard became the centre of a child pornography scandal, and he emigrated to Thailand.

Complete Formula One World Championship results
(key)

References
Footnotes

Sources

1924 births
1993 deaths
Sportspeople from Hereford
English racing drivers
English Formula One drivers
Rob Walker Racing Team Formula One drivers
24 Hours of Le Mans drivers
World Sportscar Championship drivers
British emigrants to Thailand